South Cambridgeshire was a rural district in Cambridgeshire, England established in 1934 under a County Review Order as a merger of Linton Rural District and Melbourn Rural District and part of Caxton and Arrington Rural District. In 1965 it became part of the new administrative county of Cambridgeshire and the Isle of Ely. It was abolished in 1974 under the Local Government Act 1972, and merged with the Chesterton Rural District to form a new South Cambridgeshire district.

Parishes

References 

History of Cambridgeshire
Districts of England abolished by the Local Government Act 1972